Mali elects on the national level a head of state – the president – and a legislature. The president is elected for a five-year term by the people. The National Assembly (Assemblée Nationale) has 160 members, elected for a five-year term, 147 members elected in single-seat constituencies and 13 members elected by Malians living abroad.

Mali has a multi-party system, with numerous parties in which no one party often has a chance of gaining power alone, and parties must work with each other to form coalition governments.

Latest elections

Presidential elections

Parliamentary elections

See also
List of political parties in Mali

References

External links
Adam Carr's Election Archive
African Elections Database